Pachia (Greek: Παχειά) is an uninhabited Greek island in the Cyclades in the south of Anafi.

Anafi
Cyclades
Uninhabited islands of Greece
Landforms of Thira (regional unit)
Landforms of the South Aegean
Islands of Greece